The Johnson County Public Library is a public library serving the residents of Johnson County, Kentucky. The library's collection contains 44,236 volumes, serves a population of 23,827, and circulates 120,687 items annually. It is located at 444 Main Street in Paintsville, Kentucky and was established on February 3, 1947. Although the library lacks branch locations, it does operate a daily mobile book service.

History

On December 20, 1938, the Johnson County Pack Horse Library was established, which is often considered the precursor to the modern Johnson County Public Library. The program was headquartered in a room in the historic Mayo Mansion and was operated by May Stafford. Stafford, along with many other women, circulated books throughout the county on horseback until the establishment of the Johnson County Public Library on February 3, 1947. It was housed in the former Paintsville Public Library Building until the 1960s when the library moved into its current location on Main Street in Paintsville.

Patricia Patton Kentucky Room

The Patricia Patton Kentucky Room contains numerous items on local history including census records, photographs, and legal documents. There is also a microfilm collection of both The Paintsville Herald and The Big Sandy News.

References

External links
Johnson County Public Library

Library buildings completed in 1947
Public libraries in Kentucky
Buildings and structures in Johnson County, Kentucky
1947 establishments in Kentucky
Education in Johnson County, Kentucky
Paintsville, Kentucky
County government buildings in Kentucky